Aveley is a suburb of Perth, Western Australia, east of Ellenbrook and south of The Vines. In 1897 George Hardey Barrett Lennard, grandson of Edward Pomeroy Barrett-Lennard, purchased a property in the area of which is now Aveley, naming it "Belhus" after his family's estate in Belhus, Essex, England. The name "Aveley", deriving from the eponymous town where the estate was located, was approved as a suburb name on 6 September 2006, before which the area was part of Ellenbrook. It is bordered by Gnangara Road and Lake Yakine to the south, a small part of West Swan Road, the Ellen Brook and Chateau Place to the east, The Broadway, Doig Road, and Cashman Avenue to the north, and Henley Brook Avenue to the west. The suburb is accessible from Henley Brook Avenue, The Promenade, Gnangara Road, and West Swan Road (via Millhouse Road).

Schools in this suburb include Aveley Primary School, Aveley North Primary School, and Swan Valley Anglican Community School. Aveley Secondary College is located just north of Aveley, in Ellenbrook.

References

Suburbs of Perth, Western Australia
Suburbs and localities in the City of Swan